Nyaheun (autonym: Heun ) is a Mon–Khmer language of the Bahnaric branch spoken in southern Laos. Chazée (1999:95) estimates the population at 4,200, while the 1995 Laotian census places the Nyaheun population at 5,152. According to Ethnologue, the language is "vigorous," which means it is spoken by people of all ages in its home community.

Nyaheun speakers were formerly distributed in the Senamnoy and Sepian valleys, but due to logging and hydroelectric power projects, they were forcibly relocated to Ban Tayeukseua (Tagneugsua; about 10 km southwest of Houeikong), and a new village 8 km north of Houeikong (near Ban Thongvay) (Sidwell 2003:21).

Alternate names
Nyaheun is known by many alternate names including Nhaheun, Nhahem, Nya Hoen, Nia-Heun, Nyah Heuny, Gya Hon, Nahoen, Hoen, Honh, Hun, Hin, Iahoun, Nya Hön, Nyah Heuny, Nha Heun, Yaheun, and Nyahon.

Further reading
Sidwell, Paul. 2019. Reconstructing language contact and social change on Boloven Plateau, Laos. Presented at ALMSEA (The Anthropology of Language in Mainland Southeast Asia), University of Sydney, Aug. 19-20. (Slides).

References

External links 
Sidwell, Paul (2003). A Handbook of comparative Bahnaric, Vol. 1: West Bahnaric. Pacific Linguistics, 551. Canberra: Research School of Pacific and Asian Studies, Australian National University.
http://projekt.ht.lu.se/rwaai RWAAI (Repository and Workspace for Austroasiatic Intangible Heritage)
Schliesinger, Joachim. 2003. Ethnic Groups of Laos. vol. 2 Profile of Austro-Asiatic Speaking Peoples. White Lotus. Bangkok (Many of the alternate names for Nyaheun came from this source see p. 62-67).
http://hdl.handle.net/10050/00-0000-0000-0003-9042-E@view Nyaheun in RWAAI Digital Archive

Bahnaric languages
Languages of Laos